Robert Carlo Larsen (21 June 1898 – 14 September 1981) was a Danish boxer who competed in the 1924 Summer Olympics. He was born in Hjørring. In 1924 he was eliminated in the quarter-finals of the heavyweight class after losing his fight to Henk de Best.

Larson also fight Legendary German boxer Max Schmeling, losing by TKO in the 3rd round.

References

External links
profile

1898 births
1981 deaths
Heavyweight boxers
Olympic boxers of Denmark
Boxers at the 1924 Summer Olympics
Danish male boxers
People from Hjørring
Sportspeople from the North Jutland Region